Yup is a slang word for yes and may refer to:

 YUP (band), a Finnish rock band
 "Yup" (song), a 2015 song by Easton Corbin
 Yukpa language (ISO 639:yup), spoken in Venezuela and Colombia
 An abbreviation for Yellowdog Updater
 Yale University Press
 Young Urban Professional (see Yuppie)